Manifesto was an American rock band from Washington, D.C., United States, featuring Michael Hampton (vocals, guitar, drum programming), Bert Queiroz (bass) and Ivor Hanson (drums). It was formed in 1988 after the demise of Hampton's previous short-lived bands, Embrace and One Last Wish. The trio's recording debut was the 7-inch single "Burn", released in 1988 on Skip Groff's Y&T Records. In 1992, they released their self-titled and only studio album through British independent record label Fire Records. The following year, shortly after their album was released in the United States, Manifesto disbanded.

In contrast to the hardcore punk–indebted sound of Hampton's previous bands, Manifesto features a poppier sound, taking influences from guitar and jangle pop groups of the 1980s. As a result, the band worked with producer John A. Rivers, who produced for various British guitar pop bands such as Close Lobsters and the Pastels, on its debut album.

Band members
 Michael Hampton – vocals, guitar, drum programming
 Bert Queiroz – bass guitar
 Ivor Hanson – drums

Discography

Studio albums
 Manifesto (1992)

EPs
 History (1990)
 Pattern 26 (1993)

Singles
 "Burn / Longtime" (1988)
 "Walking Backwards" (1991)
 "Gravity" (1992)
 "Pattern 26" (1992)
 "Sugar" (1992)

References

External links
 

Musical groups established in 1990
American emo musical groups
Indie pop groups from Washington, D.C.
Indie rock musical groups from Washington, D.C.
American musical trios
Musical groups disestablished in 1993